Death Rave 2010 is a various artists compilation album released in July 1994 by 21st Circuitry.

Track listing

Accolades

Personnel
Adapted from the Death Rave 2010 liner notes.

 Peter Stone – mastering
 tara ntula – cover art, design

Release history

References

External links 
 Death Rave 2010 at Discogs (list of releases)

1994 compilation albums
Techno compilation albums
21st Circuitry compilation albums